Susan Fisher may refer to:

Susan C. Fisher, Democratic member of the North Carolina General Assembly
Susan Audé Fisher, American news TV anchor

See also
Susan Fisher-Hoch, British-born infectious disease specialist
Susan Fischer, Orange Is the New Black character